Dame Penelope Alice Wilton  (born 3 June 1946), formerly styled Penelope, Lady Holm (between 1998 and 2001), is an English actress. 

Wilton is known for starring opposite Richard Briers in the BBC sitcom Ever Decreasing Circles (1984–1989); playing Homily in The Borrowers (1992) and The Return of the Borrowers (1993); and for her role as the widowed Isobel Crawley in the ITV drama Downton Abbey (2010–2015). She also played the recurring role of Harriet Jones in Doctor Who (2005–2008) and Anne in Ricky Gervais' Netflix dark comedy After Life. 

Wilton has had an extensive career on stage, receiving six Olivier Award nominations. She was nominated for Man and Superman (1981), The Secret Rapture (1988), The Deep Blue Sea (1994), John Gabriel Borkman (2008) and The Chalk Garden (2009), before winning the 2015 Olivier Award for Best Actress for Taken at Midnight. Her film appearances include Clockwise (1986), Cry Freedom (1987), Calendar Girls (2003), Shaun of the Dead (2004), Match Point (2005), Pride & Prejudice (2005), The Best Exotic Marigold Hotel (2012), The Girl (2012) and The BFG (2016).

Early life and background
Wilton was born in Scarborough, North Riding of Yorkshire, the second of three daughters of Cliff Wilton, a Cambridge-educated businessman and barrister who had played rugby union on the amateur and provincial level, going on to be an administrator in the sport, and Alice Linda Travers, a tap dancer and former actress. Leviathan, the Business Who's who- A Biographical Dictionary of Chairmen, Chief Executives and Managing Directors of British-registered Companies, ed. Ruth Dinning, Leviathan House, 1972, p. 398 

She is a niece of actors Bill Travers and Linden Travers. Her cousins include actors Angela and Richard Morant. Her maternal grandparents owned theatres.

She attended the Drama Centre London from 1965 to 1968.

Career
Wilton began her career on stage in 1969 at the Nottingham Playhouse. Her early roles included Cordelia in King Lear, both in Nottingham and at The Old Vic.

She made her Broadway debut in March 1971 when she played Araminta in the original Broadway production of The Philanthropist, and made her West End debut in August 1971 opposite Sir Ralph Richardson, in the John Osborne play West of Suez at the Cambridge Theatre. She had previously appeared in both plays at the Royal Court Theatre. She played Ruth in the original 1974 London stage production of Alan Ayckbourn's Norman Conquests trilogy.

Her television acting career began in 1972, playing Vivie Warren in the BBC2's adaptation of Mrs. Warren's Profession opposite Coral Browne in the title role and Robert Powell. The production was repeated as part of the Play of the Month series in 1974 on BBC1. In 1994, Wilton portrayed Browne in a radio adaptation of An Englishman Abroad for the BBC World Service and repeated on various BBC radio formats since. 

Following the broadcast of Mrs. Warren's Profession, Wilton then had several major TV roles, including two of the BBC Television Shakespeare productions (as Desdemona in Othello and Regan in King Lear ).

Wilton's film career includes roles in The French Lieutenant's Woman (1981), Cry Freedom (1987), Iris (2001), Calendar Girls (2003) and Shaun of the Dead (2004), Jane Austen's Pride and Prejudice (2005), Woody Allen's Match Point (2005), and in The History Boys (2006).

She did not garner fame until she appeared with Richard Briers in the 1984 BBC situation comedy, Ever Decreasing Circles, which ran for five years. She played Ann, long suffering wife of Martin (Briers), an obsessive and pedantic "do-gooder". In 2005, Wilton guest starred as Harriet Jones for two episodes in the BBC's revival of the popular TV science-fiction series Doctor Who. This guest role was written especially for her by the programme's chief writer and executive producer Russell T. Davies, with whom she had worked on Bob and Rose (ITV, 2001). The character of Jones returned as Prime Minister in the Doctor Who 2005 Christmas special "The Christmas Invasion". In the first part of the 2008 series finale, "The Stolen Earth", she made a final appearance, now as the former Prime Minister who sacrifices herself by extermination by the Daleks so that the Doctor's companions can contact him.

Wilton appeared on television as Barbara Poole, the mother of a missing woman, in the BBC television drama series Five Days in 2005; and in ITV's drama Half Broken Things (October 2007) and the BBC production of The Passion (Easter 2008). Beginning in 2010, she appeared as Isobel Crawley in all six seasons of the hit period drama Downton Abbey. She was the castaway on BBC Radio 4's Desert Island Discs in April 2008. In December 2012 and February 2013, she was the narrator in Lin Coghlan's dramatisation of Elizabeth Jane Howard's The Cazalets, broadcast on BBC Radio.

Personal life
Between 1975 and 1984, Wilton was married to actor Daniel Massey. They had a daughter, Alice, born in 1977. Before that, they had a stillborn son.

In 1991, Wilton married actor Ian Holm. In 1992, they appeared together as Pod and Homily in the BBC's adaptation of The Borrowers. A year later, they appeared together in a follow-up The Return of the Borrowers. In 1998, Ian Holm was knighted and Wilton became Lady Holm. They divorced in 2001.

Honours
Wilton was appointed an Officer of the Order of the British Empire (OBE) in the 2004 New Year Honours and was elevated to become a Dame Commander of the Order of the British Empire (DBE) in the 2016 Birthday Honours, both for services to drama.

Awards and recognition
In 2012, Wilton received an honorary doctorate from the University of Hull Scarborough Campus.

Filmography

Film

Television

Stage

References

External links
 
 
 Gareth McLean, Unspoken worlds, 25 October 2007, The Guardian
 Ancestry of Penelope Wilton, houghtonlespring.org.uk. Accessed 23 January 2023.
 Penelope Wilton interview on BBC Radio 4 Desert Island Discs, 4 April 2008.

1946 births
20th-century English actresses
21st-century English actresses
Actresses awarded damehoods
Actresses from Yorkshire
Alumni of the Drama Centre London
Critics' Circle Theatre Award winners
Dames Commander of the Order of the British Empire
English film actresses
English stage actresses
English television actresses
Laurence Olivier Award winners
Living people
Penelope Wilton
Actors from Scarborough, North Yorkshire
Wives of knights